In enzymology, a sorbose dehydrogenase is an enzyme that catalyzes the chemical reaction

L-sorbose + acceptor  5-dehydro-D-fructose + reduced acceptor

Thus, the two substrates of this enzyme are L-sorbose and acceptor, whereas its two products are 5-dehydro-D-fructose and reduced acceptor.

This enzyme belongs to the family of oxidoreductases, specifically those acting on the CH-OH group of donor with other acceptors. The systematic name of this enzyme class is L-sorbose:acceptor 5-oxidoreductase. This enzyme is also called L-sorbose:(acceptor) 5-oxidoreductase.

References

 

EC 1.1.99
Enzymes of unknown structure